The Ritual Ladle from the 15th-14th centuries BC, was discovered in Lchashen, Armenia with a decorated long handle. It is kept in the History Museum of Armenia under the number 2007-3.

Description 
The ritual ladle is a bronze artifact measuring 52 x 20.5 cm. The long handle of the ritual ladle is cylindrical, tubular, and hollow. It is decorated with wedge-shaped cuts ending with a sculptural figure of a bird sitting at the end of the wheel. The bird's feathers are marked with rectangular cuts. The center of the wheel is marked with an image of the cross. The ritual ladle was found in a mausoleum inside a bronze pot.

References

Further reading
 View from the Bronze Age, album-catalog, History Museum of Armenia, 2010
 Harutyun Mnatsakanyan, The Main Stages of Lchashen's Development of Culture.  Yerevan, 1968

External links
 The Main Stages of Lchashen's Development of Culture

Archaeological discoveries in Europe
Archaeology of Armenia
Bronze Age Europe
Bronzeware
Spoons